Augusto Sánchez Beriguete (born 19 December 1983 in Santa Cruz de Barahona) is a Dominican cyclist.

Major results

2004
 1st Stage 8 Tour de la Martinique
2006
 1st Stage 10 Vuelta a Cuba
2007
 1st  National Time Trial Championships
 1st Stage 8 Tour de Guadeloupe
2008
 2nd Overall Vuelta a la Independencia Nacional
2010
 1st  National Time Trial Championships
 1st Overall Vuelta a la Independencia Nacional
1st Stage 2
2011
 1st Stage 1 Vuelta a la Independencia Nacional
2013
 1st Stage 2 Vuelta a la Independencia Nacional
2014
 1st  National Time Trial Championships
2016
 1st Stage 1 (TTT) Vuelta a la Independencia Nacional
2017
 1st  National Time Trial Championships
 1st Stage 1 (TTT) Vuelta a la Independencia Nacional
2018
 1st Overall Vuelta a la Independencia Nacional
1st Stage 2

References

1983 births
Living people
Dominican Republic male cyclists
Competitors at the 2010 Central American and Caribbean Games